It's Hard to Write with a Little Hand is the only album by Rochester, New York, mathcore band Lethargy, released in 1996.

The final track, "Humorless," is a remix of "Humor Me".

Critical reception
AllMusic wrote that the album "helped elevate heavy metal to unprecedented 'serious music' status, its labyrinthine sonic contortions paving the way for what would later become recognized as the 'math-metal' movement."

Track listing

Lineup
Erik Burke - Guitar, vocals
Brann Dailor - Drums
Bill Kelliher - Guitar
Adam Routier - Bass

References

1996 albums
Lethargy (band) albums